Mario Bonić (born 4 August 1952 in Dubrovnik, Croatia, FPR Yugoslavia) is a Croatian retired football manager and player who played a forward.

References

External links

1952 births
Living people
Sportspeople from Dubrovnik
Association football forwards
Yugoslav footballers
NK GOŠK Dubrovnik players
GNK Dinamo Zagreb players
Apollon Smyrnis F.C. players
Panachaiki F.C. players
FC Red Bull Salzburg players
Yugoslav First League players
Super League Greece players
Austrian Football Bundesliga players
Yugoslav expatriate footballers
Expatriate footballers in Greece
Yugoslav expatriate sportspeople in Greece
Expatriate footballers in Austria
Yugoslav expatriate sportspeople in Austria
Croatian football managers
NK GOŠK Dubrovnik managers
Ethnikos Piraeus F.C. managers
Proodeftiki F.C. managers
Croatian expatriate football managers
Expatriate football managers in Greece
Croatian expatriate sportspeople in Greece